Azaleos Corporation was a Seattle-based American corporation. Founded in 2004 by Roger Gerdes and Keith McCall, Azaleos provided remote management for Microsoft Exchange, Microsoft SharePoint and Microsoft Lync.

Company background
Azaleos was founded and incorporated as a Delaware corporation in May 2004 by Roger Gerdes and Keith McCall.  The company's early funding was provided by Second Avenue Partners and Ignition Partners.

Services and technology
Azaleos provided remote managed services for Microsoft Exchange, SharePoint, and Lync.

In 2009, the company merged with M3 Technology Group, an email migration and managed services company focused on Microsoft Exchange and Microsoft Active Directory based in Charlotte, North Carolina.

As a National Systems Integrator (NSI), Azaleos was one of Microsoft's top 34 partners in the United States, a "Microsoft Gold Partner" in messaging, communications and portals & collaboration competencies, and a member of Microsoft's Exchange, SharePoint and Data Protection Manager Technology Adoption Programs.

The company had reseller agreements with IBM, Verizon Business, CDW, and Savvis (a CenturyLink company) all of whom resold Azaleos managed services under their brand.

Azaleos was US-based with network operations centers in Seattle, Washington and Charlotte, North Carolina.

Awards
Azaleos ranked 28th on Deloitte's Technology Fast 500, 2011 ranking of the "500 fastest growing technology, media, telecommunications, life sciences, and clean technology companies in North America".
Azaleos' Services for Microsoft Exchange Server received the eWEEK "Excellence Award" in the "collaboration" category.
Azaleos Virtual Edition service garnered the "Best of Tech-Ed IT Professional Award" in the messaging category from Windows IT Pro and SQL Server Magazine.

Acquisition
On December 18, 2012, Avanade announced its acquisition of Azaleos.  Approximately 200 Azaleos employees joined Avanade as part of the acquisition, most of them located in Seattle, Washington, and Charlotte, North Carolina. Terms of the transaction were not disclosed.

References

Companies based in Seattle
Privately held companies based in Washington (state)